Boneh-ye Jan Mohammad (also Romanized as Boneh-ye Jān Moḩammad) is a village in Sadat Rural District, in the Central District of Lali County, Khuzestan Province, Iran. At the 2006 census, its population was 33, in 6 families.

References 

Populated places in Lali County